Sitana is a genus of lizards, collectively known as the fan-throated lizards, from the family Agamidae. They are found in Nepal, India, Sri Lanka and Pakistan. The genus comprises fourteen species, including several recently discovered species, such as two new species from Sri Lanka. In 2016, a new genus named Sarada was erected, consisting of one former Sitana species and two newly described ones. Sarada is the sister genus of Sitana. Together they form a clade which sister group is Otocryptis.

Description
Sitana are small to medium-sized lizards. They are ground dwellers, primarily eating insects but also mollusks and plant seeds.

Males measure  and females  in snout–vent length. In an example of convergent evolution, males have prominent dewlaps, similar to anoles, which are used in communication during the breeding season. The dewlap may be small to large, depending on the species. Females lack the dewlap.

Species
There are fourteen species that are listed here alphabetically:
Sitana devakai Amarasinghe, Ineich & Karunaratna, 2014 – Devaka's fan-throated lizard
Sitana dharwarensis Ambekar, Murthy, & Mirza 2020
Sitana fusca Schleich & Kästle, 1998 – dark sitana
Sitana gokakensis Deepak, Khandekar, Chaitanya, & Karanth, 2018 – Gokak fan-throated lizard
Sitana kalesari Bahuguna, 2015
Sitana laticeps Deepak and Giri, 2016 – broad-headed fan-throated lizard
Sitana marudhamneydhal Deepak, Khandekar, Varma & Chaitanya, 2016
Sitana ponticeriana Cuvier, 1829 – Pondichéry fan-throated lizard
Sitana schleichi Anders & Kästle, 2002 – Suklaphantah sitana
Sitana sivalensis Schleich, Kästle & Shah, 1998; endemic to Nepal – Siwalik sitana
Sitana spinaecephalus Deepak, Vyas and Giri, 2016 – spiny-headed fan-throated lizard
Sitana sushili Deepak, Tillack, Kar, Sarkar, & Mohapatra, 2021 – Sushil's fan-throated lizard 
Sitana thondalu Deepak, Khandekar, Chaitanya, & Karanth, 2018 – Nagarjuna Sagar fan-throated lizard
Sitana visiri Deepak, 2016 – palm leaf fan-throated lizard

References

Sitana
Lizard genera
Lizards of Asia
Taxa named by Georges Cuvier